Road Safety World Series is a T20 cricket league, which features former international cricket players from various nations. Road Safety World Series is founded by Ravi Gaikwad, the chief road traffic officer of Thane in collaboration with the BCCI.

Every year this league is organized by the Road Safety World Series organization to raise awareness about road safety. The series features players from India, England, Sri Lanka, West Indies, South Africa, Australia, New Zealand and Bangladesh. Sunil Gavaskar, former India captain, is the commissioner of the series, while Sachin Tendulkar is the brand ambassador. New Zealand Legends are the new entrants in this series from 2022.  

The Road Safety World Series is supported by the Ministry of Road Transport and Highways and the Ministry of Electronics and Information Technology and Ministry of Youth Affairs and Sports of the Government of India.

Results

Team performance 
Correct as of the final of the 2020–21 Road Safety World Series. Teams are ordered by best result, then by winning percentage, then alphabetically: 

 † - Australia Legends played 1 match against Sri Lanka Legends and forfeited their remaining matches as they could not travel to India due to COVID-19 restrictions.

Teams 

Team appearing for the first time, in alphabetical order per year.

Team results by tournament 

 
 Legend

  – Champions
  – Runners-up
  – Semi-finalist
 R1 – Round 1 (group stage)
 Q – Qualified
 × – Qualified but withdrew

 † - Australia Legends played 1 match against Sri Lanka Legends and forfeited their remaining matches as they could not travel to India due to COVID-19 restrictions.

Broadcasters  
 
As Viacom 18 have the broadcasting rights of the tournaments, you can watch the matches on the dedicated sports channel Sports18, Sports18 Khel and Colors Cineplex, Colors Cineplex Superhits, Jio Cinema application.

See also
Legends League Cricket

References

Road safety campaigns
Twenty20 cricket matches
Road safety